In the 1920s and 1930s, the Italian Regia Marina (Royal Navy) built a series of heavy cruisers as part of a modernization program to use the tonnage allotted to Italy for cruisers by the international naval treaties of the period. The Regia Marina had initially intended to build six cruisers, which would operate as two three-ship divisions, but  of the Zara class was used as the fleet flagship while the s were being rebuilt, so a seventh ship was ordered. The seven ships represented disagreements within the naval high command, with one faction favoring high speed at the expense of armor protection (which resulted in the Trentos and Bolzano) and another that preferred heavier armor in exchange for a reduced top speed (which produced the Zaras).

All seven ships saw extensive service in the Mediterranean Sea during World War II, where they repeatedly engaged elements of the British Royal Navy. Italian heavy cruisers took part in the Battles of Calabria, Taranto, Cape Spartivento, Cape Matapan, First and Second Sirte between 1940 and 1943. Three of the Zaras—, and Pola—were sunk in a close-range night action with British battleships at the Battle of Cape Matapan in 1941, Trento was torpedoed and sunk by British forces in June 1942, and Bolzano was badly damaged by a British submarine in August 1942, which left her out of action for the rest of the war. United States heavy bombers raided La Maddalena in April 1943, sinking Trieste and badly damaging Gorizia; the latter vessel and Bolzano were later attacked by Italian commandos while Italy was under German occupation in 1944 to prevent the Germans from repairing and reactivating them. They were both raised and scrapped after the war.



Trento class

To keep the design under the limit while achieving the speeds requested by the high command, the design staff was forced to drastically reduce the scale of armor protection. Their weak armor led officers in the Regia Marina to demand better-protected vessels for the next class of cruiser to be built.

After Italy entered World War II in June 1940, Trento and Trieste saw extensive action against British forces in the Mediterranean Sea, including at the battles of Calabria, Cape Spartivento, and Cape Matapan in July and November 1940 and March 1941, respectively. In November 1941, Trieste was torpedoed by the submarine ; she spent most of the next year under repair. In the meantime, Trento was also present during the inconclusive First and Second Battles of Sirte. The Italian fleet sortied to attack the British Operation Harpoon convoy in June 1942, and while on the way, Trento was torpedoed twice, first by a Bristol Beaufighter torpedo bomber and then sunk by the submarine  with very heavy loss of life on 15 June. Trieste was moved to La Maddalena, Sardinia, where she was later sunk by United States heavy bombers on 10 April 1943.

Zara class

While the Trentos were still under construction, elements of the Italian naval command began to doubt the effectiveness of the new vessels, which sacrificed armor protection in favor of very high speeds. They advocated a more balanced design that would incorporate more comprehensive armor, while retaining the battery of eight 203 mm guns and a speed of at least . To accomplish these goals, the high command permitted the designers to exceed the 10,000-ton limit, and instructed them to adopt as many weight-saving changes as possible. These included using a light weight propulsion system, removing torpedo tubes from the design, and abandoning the flush deck of the Trentos in favor of a stepped down main deck. The heavy armor of the Zaras made them the best-protected cruisers built by any navy until the United States' , laid down in 1945.

Gorizia, the sole surviving member of the class, saw action at the First and Second Battles of Sirte in December 1941 and March 1942, respectively. While the ship was moored in La Maddalena on 10 April 1943, a major attack from United States Army Air Forces heavy bombers sank Trieste and hit Gorizia with three bombs, inflicting serious damage. She was still under repair in La Spezia when Italy surrendered to the Allies in September, and she was seized by German forces when they occupied much of the country. On 22 June 1944, Italian frogmen used Chariot manned torpedoes to enter the harbor and sink Gorizia, though Gorizia survived the attack. She was ultimately sold for scrap in 1949.

Bolzano

By 1928, the Italian navy had begun rebuilding the s, and as a result, Pola was completed with an enlarged bridge so she could temporarily serve as the fleet flagship. She would then be unavailable for the planned three-ship cruiser divisions, and so the navy ordered a seventh cruiser to replace Pola. The design requirements for the new vessel reverted to those adopted for the Trentos, as the senior leaders of the navy continued to believe that speed was more important than armor. A series of changes were made to the basic Trento design, including the use of the longer 53-cal. guns adopted for the Zaras, new boilers, and a raised forecastle deck.

Like the rest of the Italian heavy cruisers, Bolzano was present at the major fleet actions during the first two years of the war in the Mediterranean. She was lightly damaged at Calabria and she engaged the British battlecruiser  at Cape Spartivento, though neither vessel scored any hits. While returning from a failed attempt to intercept a British convoy in August 1941, Bolzano was torpedoed by the British submarine . Repairs were completed by November, but she was torpedoed again in August 1942 by the submarine , sustaining serious damage. She was still out of service in La Spezia, awaiting repairs, when Italy surrendered to the Allies on 3 September 1943; on 8–9 September, German troops occupied La Spezia. On the night of 21–22 June 1944, a team of British and Italian frogmen—Italy having re-entered the war on the side of the Allies—entered La Spezia using Chariot manned torpedoes to sink Bolzano and Gorizia to prevent the Germans from sinking them as blockships. They succeeded in sinking Bolzano but Gorizia remained afloat. Bolzano was ultimately raised in 1949 and thereafter broken up.

See also
List of protected cruisers of Italy
List of battleships of Italy

Notes

References

External links
 Incrociatori Marina Militare website 

Italy
Cruisers, heavy